The AA Northwestern District is a high school conference in the state of Virginia that includes Frederick County and Warren County.  The Northwestern District member schools compete in Region II with the schools from the AA Dulles District, AA Jefferson District, and AA Evergreen District.

The Northwestern District was not originally known for being strong in football, yet the 2005 season brought about the dominance of Sherando and Liberty and the emergence of James Wood, Millbrook, and Brentsville as solid football teams. In 2007 Sherando reached the state finals. In basketball, the 2005 Millbrook squad finished second in the region and fell in the state quarterfinals, one year after a last place finish in the district in their inaugural year. In 2008 the Millbrook squad won the state finals bringing the first state championship in basketball to the area.

Membership Changes
The Northwestern District has faced a great deal of change throughout its history.  Due to the high rate of growth in Northern Virginia and the northern Shenandoah Valley, many former members have moved up to Group AAA for periods of time, such as James Wood and Sherando.  The Northwestern District also experienced a large increase in membership of Loudoun County schools in the late 1990s and early 2000s which prompted the creation of an all-Loudoun County Dulles District in 2001.  In 2007, Liberty High School moved to the AAA Cedar Run District of the AAA Northwest Region, and Warren County High School split in half to form Skyline High School.

2008 will see the addition of the Kettle Run High School Cougars in Fauquier County. The Cougars will compete in the Northwestern District as a full member in all sports but football, where they will play an independent varsity schedule for 2008.

2009 could bring even more change to the Northwestern District. Former members Liberty and Fauquier will be AA size again due to Kettle Run's opening, which has led to discussion on whether the district will be a ten-team entity after losing Central to Group A, or if it will split into two five-team districts. Such a split would likely see the three Frederick County schools join with Handley and one of the Warren County schools, while the three Fauquier County schools joined with the other Warren school and Brentsville. As of January 23, the VHSL still plans for the Northwestern District to include all ten teams.

The district was granted an appeal to the VHSL to split into two districts for 2009. The plan would be for Millbrook, Sherando, James Wood, Handley and Skyline to keep the Northwestern District name, and Brentsvile, Warren County, Fauquier, Liberty and Kettle Run to form the new AA Evergreen District. Despite the proximity of both Culpeper and Eastern View High Schools to the Northeastern District members other than Warren County (Culpeper is now in the AAA Cedar Run District with Liberty and Fauquier, and will also drop to AA), the two Culpeper schools will compete in Region I. Had those schools been part of the plan, Warren County would almost certainly have moved to the Northwestern District, keeping it with county rival Skyline.

Member schools
Brentsville District Tigers, Nokesville
Central Falcons, Woodstock
Culpeper County Blue Devils, Culpepper
Fauquier Falcons, Warrenton
Meridian Mustangs, Falls Church (partial members of the Bull Run District)
James Wood Colonels, Winchester
John Handley Judges, Winchester
Kettle Run Cougars, Nokesville
Liberty Eagles, Bealeton
Manassas Park Cougars, Manassas Park
Millbrook Pioneers, Winchester
Sherando Warriors, Stephens City
Skyline Hawks, Front Royal
Warren County Wildcats, Front Royal
William Monroe Dragons, Standardsville

Former Northwestern District Members
Broad Run High School of Ashburn, Virginia (now in the Potomac District)
Clarke County High School of Berryville, Virginia (now in the Bull Run District)
Loudoun County High School of Leesburg, Virginia (now in the Dulles District)
Loudoun Valley High School of Purcellville, Virginia (now in the  Dulles District)
Osbourn High School of Manassas, Virginia (now in the Cedar Run District)
Park View High School of Sterling, Virginia (now in the Dulles District)
Potomac Falls High School of Sterling, Virginia (now in the Potomac District)
Stone Bridge High School of Ashburn, Virginia (now in the Potomac District)

External links
Northwestern District official site

Virginia High School League